The 1943 National Challenge Cup was the 30th edition of the United States Football Association's annual open cup. Today, the tournament is known as the Lamar Hunt U.S. Open Cup. Teams from the American Soccer League II competed in the tournament, based on qualification methods in their base region.

Brooklyn Hispano from Brooklyn, New York won the tournament in a replay match by defeating, Morgan Strasser of Pittsburgh, Pennsylvania in the process.

External links
 1943 National Challenge Cup – TheCup.us

Lamar Hunt U.S. Open Cup
U.S. Open Cup